Oleksiy Pozdnyakov (born 1 April 1995 in Pryluky, Ukraine) is a male Ukrainian athlete specialising in the 200 metres and 400 metres. He won two gold medals at the 2019 European Games. He competed at the 2019 World Championships, 2018 European Championships, 2019 European Games, three (2014, 2017, 2019) European Athletics Team Championships, and 2019 Summer Universiade.

International competitions

Personal bests
As of July 17, 2022.

Outdoor
 100 metres – 10.90 (Kropyvnytskiy 2019)
 200 metres – 21.05 (Lutsk 2018)
 300 metres – 33.93 (Pärnu 2018)
 400 metres – 46.42 (Kropyvnytskiy 2018)
Indoor
 60 metres – 7.01 (Sumy 2019)
 200 metres – 21.71 (Sumy 2020)
 400 metres – 47.65 (Sumy 2019)
 Long jump – 6.58 (Sumy 2017)

References

1995 births
Living people
People from Pryluky
Ukrainian male sprinters
Athletes (track and field) at the 2019 European Games
European Games medalists in athletics
European Games gold medalists for Ukraine
20th-century Ukrainian people
21st-century Ukrainian people